Medellín de Bravo, formerly known as Tecamachales, is a town in the state of Veracruz de Ignacio de la Llave, Mexico and the capital of the municipality of Medellín . It is part of the Metropolitan Area of Veracruz.

History
In pre-Columbian America the place was called Tecamachales. After the battle of La Noche Triste in 1520, Hernán Cortés ordered Gonzalo de Sandoval to found Medellín. In the year 1529, Don Juan de Zumárraga, bishop of Mexico, arrived in the town for the inauguration of the local church, considered the second in New Spain, which received the name of San Miguel Arcángel.

Festivals
In September, celebrations takes place in honour of the Archangel Michael, the patron of the town.

External links
Town website of Medellín de Bravo, Veracruz

Populated places in Veracruz
Populated places established in 1520